The 1925 Boston University Terriers football team was an American football team that represented Boston University during the 1925 college football season. Led by fifth-year head coach Charles Whelan, the team compiled a 3–4 record and was outscored by a total of 181 to 34.

Schedule

References

Boston University
Boston University Terriers football seasons
Boston University Terriers football